Nedumpana  is a grama panchayath in Kollam district in the state of Kerala, India.

Demographics
 India census, Nedumpana had a population of 51384 with 24549 males and 26835 females.

Geography
Nedumpana is a countryside in Kollam district featuring a typical kerala village consisting paddy fields, wetlands, river channels and highlands. The area can be categorised into Ida Nadu (Mid land or plains) with an average elevation of 108 meter above mean sea level. 
Laterite soil and Alluvial Soil constitutes the major soil types. Major rainy season is the South West Monsoon, which bring about 130cm of rain. Out of the total area , 6276 acres of land is culturable.

Civic administration 
Nedumpana panchayat is ruled by left democratic front since the formation of panchayat. Panchayat received  Swaraj Trophy for the best panchayat in the State for many times.

References

Villages in Kollam district